Euvola raveneli, or Ravenel's scallop, is a species of bivalve mollusc in the family Pectinidae. It can be found along the Atlantic coast of North America, ranging from North Carolina to the West Indies.

References

Pectinidae
Molluscs described in 1898